Chuck is the third studio album by Canadian rock band Sum 41. The album was released on October 12, 2004. It is the band's last album to feature guitarist Dave Baksh as he left Sum 41 on May 11, 2006, to pursue his career with his own band Brown Brigade. This is the final album to feature the full classic lineup (Baksh, Deryck Whibley, Cone McCaslin and Steve Jocz). Baksh returned in 2015, but Frank Zummo replaced Jocz that same year. Chuck peaked at No. 2 on the Canadian Albums Chart and No. 10 on the US Billboard 200, making it the band's highest-charting album until it would be surpassed by Underclass Hero in 2007.

The album's title is named after a volunteer UN peacekeeper named Chuck Pelletier who was in the Democratic Republic of the Congo where Sum 41 was filming a documentary for War Child Canada. Fighting broke out during production, and Pelletier helped the band evacuate their hotel during the fighting, as he was staying at the same hotel.

The album's lyrical content has been described as darker and more mature than the band's previous work. It also had a different sound, mixing punk rock and melodic hardcore with heavy metal. The album proved to be a success, receiving acclaim from both critics and fans, as well as selling over five million copies. Singles such as "We're All to Blame" and "Pieces" gained success on the Canadian and American charts, and the album won a Juno Award for "Rock Album of the Year" in 2005.

Background
The band's previous album Does This Look Infected became a commercial and critical success, and the band went on a tour in the album's support. In mid-2004, the band took a break from touring and filmed a documentary for War Child Canada in the Congo. The film was called Rocked: Sum 41 in Congo and was released in 2005 by MTV. However, fighting broke out during the filming while the band was staying in a hotel.

"The shooting was all around us, and all these people were waiting, probably to die," said drummer Steve Jocz, reflecting on the experience. "Two UN people arrived at the scene and gave a speech about how everything would be fine," bassist Jason McCaslin mentioned. "And then after they left, things just went crazy."

Vocalist/guitarist Deryck Whibley mentioned that he thought that a day after the UN gave an update about safety, he was expecting they would be able to evacuate. The next day, the band members woke up at 5:00 in the morning when two gunshots were fired. "We went to the hotel's restaurant to get some breakfast, when the gunfire just got closer to us," said guitarist Dave Baksh. A U.N. peacekeeper named Charles "Chuck" Pelletier instructed the residents of the hotel to leave the restaurant. Whibley recalled, "We all just went into McCaslin's room, where there was around 43 other people there. We were all hiding in the bathroom and hiding on the floor." Baksh added, "Our U.N. peacekeeper was armed with a club, a new club because the price tag was still on it, but they were armed with guns".

Pelletier continued to reassure the band and others at the hotel that everything would be okay. After the crowd was in hiding, Pelletier left to get help. The U.N. continued trying to find out as much information on the gunfire as possible, but updates were few. "After a while, the gunfire seemed to start dying down, and then people started to go outside and they started talking. We seemed to be feeling pretty good, but then out of nowhere, the huge gunfire just went off," stated Whibley. "This war was so unpredictable. At one point, it sounded like it was far away, and at another point, it sounded like it was right outside the door. Then Chuck came in and told everyone to wait for the APC's to arrive. That was probably the scariest part, when we were waiting to get into the APC's." Baksh recalled, "I remember just waiting there and just wondering what the fuck was gonna happen."

Pelletier called for armored carriers to take the hotel's occupants out of the hot zone. "By then, I  just kept thinking about everything we did as a band and everything I've done as a person, and I thought, 'This is it. This is how we're gonna die,'" Whibley said. After nearly six hours, the carriers arrived, and the band and the forty other civilians were taken to safety. In honor of Pelletier, the band decided to name their next album after him. Pelletier was awarded the Medal of Bravery by the Governor General of Canada for his actions.

Recording

When the band returned home, the band members found themselves very depressed after what happened in the Congo. By spring of 2003, the band members began practicing parts for a new album on their own before going into a studio. "The music's better, the songwriting's better, and there's more musical elements in this album," Jocz stated. "We put more elements in this time around, and it feels like the next logical step in what we want our band to sound like".

"We never wanted to make the same album over and over again. We've decided we wanted to do something different every time," said McCaslin. "We started practicing on our own, and then we just put all of our parts together." The album was also mentioned to having a lot of heavy metal influences on it, with Metallica and Iron Maiden being main inspirations for the album's style. "Dave was raised on a lot of heavy metal and grunge," McCaslin noted. "Deryck and I were raised more on California punk rock music," said Jocz. "When we started the band, we were mainly inspired by bands such as NOFX and Pennywise, but when you get older, your brain starts branching off and you start listening to other music."

Chuck was produced by Grieg Nori, and recorded at various studios: Sound City in Van Nuys, California; Ocean in Burbank, California; Reaction in Toronto, Ontario; Umbrella Sound, Toronto, Ontario; Soundtrack, New York City; and Sidecar in North Hollywood, California. Matt Hyde acted as main engineer, with additional engineers Ed Krautner and Cameron Webb, both of whom operated Pro Tools; Jorge Vivo did additional editing. They were assisted by Pete Martinez (at Sound City), Miles Wilson (at Sound City), Jason Cupp (at Ocean), Chris Stringer (at Reaction), Robert Poteraj (at Soundtrack), Matthew Davies (at Soundtrack), and Steve Sisco (at Sidecar). "Intro", "Angels with Dirty Faces", "Open Your Eyes", "Slipping Away", "I'm Not the One", "Welcome to Hell", "Pieces", and "88" were mixed by Andy Wallace at sSountrack, with assistance from Sisco; John O'Mahoney operated Pro Tools.  "No Reason", "We're All to Blame", "Some Say", "The Bitter End", and "There's No Solution" was mixed by Tom Lord-Alge at South Beach Studios in Miami, Florida with assistant engineer Femio Hernández. Brian Gardner mastered the album at Bernie Grundman Mastering.

Composition

Music and style

Chuck has been described under many genres, including alternative metal, punk metal, skate punk, melodic hardcore, heavy metal, thrash metal, nu metal, and punk rock, merging elements of hardcore punk with heavy metal. Apple Music described Chuck as a blend of melodic hardcore with heavy metal influences. On the sound of the album, the band have cited Metallica and Refused as major influences. Michael Endelman of Entertainment Weekly described it as "a meeting of two worlds — extreme metal and pop-savvy punk — that rarely pass each other in the halls, let alone hang out after school." Dave Simpson at The Guardian stated "The spiky quartet furnish their usual shouty vocals with grinding riffola and twiddly guitar solos, just as the rest of the post-Linkin Park world are realizing nu metal wasn't such a good idea." Sum 41 abandoned the pop punk style with this album, according to Andrew Blackie of PopMatters. Alan di Perna of Guitar World called it "their heaviest album yet", and as going from "flirt[ing] with metal on both [prior] albums, but with Chuck they’ve fully embraced it." The fifth and eleventh tracks on the album, "Some Say" and "Pieces" respectively, has been described as alternative rock.

Lyrics

The album's lyrics have been described as being darker and more mature. Several songs focus on darker subject matters. Most of the lyrics on the album focus on politics and are influenced by the band's experience at the Congo. The album also focuses on other themes such as death ("The Bitter End"), depression ("Slipping Away"), anarchy in the world ("I'm Not the One"), and drug addiction ("Angels with Dirty Faces").
The band has mentioned that "We're All to Blame" is about the "state of the world due to war, people dying, people living in fear, and the power of corporations, amongst other concerns." The band said "Pieces" "is about a relationship, but not necessarily one with a girl. "Maybe you're better left alone — fuck everybody else."

Commercial performance

Chuck was a commercial success, selling over 5,000,000 copies worldwide. The album won a Juno Award in 2005 for Best Rock Album of the Year. The album was certified gold in Japan, double platinum in Canada and gold in the United States.

Critical reception

Chuck received positive reviews, with Metacritic giving the album an aggregated score of 63 out of 100 based on 11 reviews. Allmusic gave the album a positive review, saying "Chuck is a concise album that clocks in at just over a half-hour, with a basic understanding that fast and loud is what the band does best." Entertainment Weekly said that "It may sound heinous on paper, but trust us, the first single, "We're All to Blame," is far better than it has a right to be." E! Online said that "But whether they're being snotty or serious, there is a constant thread at work: those catchy melodies." Music OMH said that Chuck "isn't perfect" but also added that "Sum 41 have certainly added a heck of a lot more colour to their previously, partially monochrome musical output." Lane Devis of 411mania.com compared the album to Blink-182's 2003 self-titled album, Green Day's American Idiot, and Good Charlotte's The Chronicles of Life and Death, saying "The lyrics are serious in this album are far cries from the immature lyrics and antics that have become almost trademark for Sum 41." Common Sense Media gave it four stars out of five, saying "Rugged intensity makes up for the diminished playfulness. Lyrics are clean but somber. You don't like your life, politics, or the world we live in? You might not be able to do much about it, but perhaps – following the example of Sum 41 – you can write some interesting, lyrical songs about the stuff that drives you crazy", and also called it "socially conscious punk rock".

Decoy Music said "for the most part, it's obvious the band has grown up. There are some slower songs and some acoustic guitars and some ballads and all that good stuff. But the band still rocks hard 95% of the time and the fact they've gotten heavier actually accentuates their poppyness better than the punk aspect. The songs are still fast and guitar-driven, the drums are still extremely random and manic and awesome—all in all, this is still a Sum 41 record. But it's just a better one." Stuart Green of exclaim.ca said "Musically the band has never sounded more determined or cohesive (the notable exceptions being the Oasis sound-alike "Some Say" and the power mellower "Slipping Away" and "Pieces"). Lyrically the album also advances the case for these guys as strong songwriters." Diamond in the Rock said "Although some hail Chuck as a complete departure from the band's enjoyable punk style, this album adds diversity to Sum 41's discography as the hardcore rock vibes lend to an engaging, albeit satisfactorily brief, sound." However, not all reviews were positive. Punknews.org was somewhat disappointed with the album, saying "No one can deny the band's musical talent, and the more serious lyrical themes are a definite improvement, but the lack of consistency kills this album. The highlight of Sum 41's discography is going to come when they fully embrace their metal influences and make a straight-up metal album, and sadly Chuck misses the mark", but also added "If you are still under the impression that Sum 41 is a joke band or a Beastie Boys-wannabe, give some of these songs a try, and you may be pleasantly surprised." Robert Christgau assigned the album a "dud" rating.

Legacy

Though the reviews were more mixed to positive, the album received critical acclaim from the fanbase and is considered a highlight of Sum 41's discography with singles "We're All to Blame", and "Pieces" becoming some of the band's most popular and beloved songs. The album was not only a commercial success, but the album won a Juno Award for "Rock Album of the Year" in 2005.

Track listing
All tracks written by Sum 41.

Personnel
Personnel per booklet.
Sum 41
 Deryck Whibley – lead vocals, rhythm guitar, piano, keyboards, mellotron
 Jason McCaslin – bass guitar, backing vocals
 Steve Jocz – drums, backing vocals
 Dave Baksh – lead guitar, backing vocals

Production

 Greig Nori – producer
 Matt Hyde – engineer
 Ed Krautner – Pro Tools, additional engineer
 Cameron Webb – Pro Tools, additional engineer
 Jorge Vivo – additional editing
 Andy Wallace – mixing (tracks 1, 4, 7–11, 13)
 Steve Sisco – assistant
 John O'Mahoney – Pro Tools
 Tom Lord-Alge – mixing (tracks 2, 3, 5, 6, 12)
 Femio Hernández – assistant engineer
 Pete Martinez – assistant
 Miles Wilson – assistant
 Jason Cupp – assistant
 Chris Stringer – assistant
 Robert Poteraj – assistant
 Matthew Davies – assistant
 Brian Gardner – mastering
 Louis Marino – art direction, album design
 GIA – illustrations, artwork

Charts and certifications

Album

Singles

Certifications

Awards

Juno Awards

|-
| 2005 || Chuck || Rock Album of the Year ||

Chuck Acoustic EP (Tour Edition Promo)

Chuck Acoustic EP (Tour Edition Promo) is an acoustic EP released by Sum 41 in 2005 in Japan only. It was released after the release of the album Chuck with the Japanese tour edition of the album.

The EP features only five songs, all of which are all-new acoustic versions to previously released songs. "Pieces", "Some Say" and "There's No Solution" are featured on the album Chuck while, "Over My Head (Better Off Dead)" and "No Brains" are from the previous album Does This Look Infected?.

Track listing
 "Pieces" (Acoustic)  – 3:16
 "No Brains" (Acoustic)  – 3:03
 "Over My Head (Better Off Dead)" (Acoustic)  – 2:44
 "Some Say" (Acoustic)  – 3:42
 "There's No Solution" (Acoustic)  – 3:26

References

External links

Chuck at YouTube (streamed copy where licensed)
 

2004 albums
Aquarius Records (Canada) albums
Island Records albums
Sum 41 albums
Albums produced by Greig Nori
Juno Award for Rock Album of the Year albums